Adrian Ponce (born 25 September 1961) is a Mexican wrestler. He competed in the men's Greco-Roman 57 kg at the 1988 Summer Olympics.

References

External links
 

1961 births
Living people
Mexican male sport wrestlers
Olympic wrestlers of Mexico
Wrestlers at the 1988 Summer Olympics
Place of birth missing (living people)